Barbengo is a quarter of the city of Lugano, Switzerland. It includes the settlements of Cadepiano, Campagnore, Casaccia, Cernesio, Garaverio and Figino. Barbengo was formerly a municipality of its own, having been incorporated into Lugano in 2008.

The population of Barbengo dropped by 3.9% between 2015 and 2020.

References

External links
 
 Official site of the quarter
 

Former municipalities of Ticino
Districts of Lugano